The 2007 Maui Invitational Tournament, an annual early-season college basketball tournament held in Lahaina, Hawaii, was held November 19–21 at Lahaina Civic Center.  The winning team was Duke Blue Devils.

Bracket 
* – Denotes overtime period

References

Maui Invitational Tournament
Maui Invitational
Maui